Atif Ashraf (born 26 May 1980) is a Pakistani first-class cricketer who played for Islamabad cricket team.

References

External links
 

1980 births
Living people
Pakistani cricketers
Islamabad cricketers
Cricketers from Islamabad
Zarai Taraqiati Bank Limited cricketers
Islamabad Leopards cricketers